Carl Epting Mundy Jr. (July 16, 1935 – April 2, 2014) was a United States Marine Corps four-star general who served as the 30th Commandant of the Marine Corps and a member of the Joint Chiefs of Staff from July 1, 1991 until his retirement on June 30, 1995, after 42 years of service. He was notable for his opposition to military service by gay people and for helping to shape the military's "don't ask, don't tell" policy of 1993.

From 1996 to 2000, Mundy served as president and CEO of the United Service Organizations. He was also the chairman of the Marine Corps University Foundation, and served on a number of corporate boards.

Early life and education
Mundy was born on July 16, 1935 in Atlanta, Georgia.  His family moved frequently when he was a young child, settling in Waynesville, North Carolina when Mundy was about 10 years old.  He graduated from Sidney Lanier High School in Montgomery, Alabama.  At age 18, he enlisted in the U.S. Marine Corps Reserve.

Marine career

Mundy enlisted in the Marine Corps Reserve and enrolled in the Platoon Leaders Class Program in December 1953 while attending college – serving in the 38th Special Infantry Company, Montgomery, Alabama and rising to the rank of sergeant. He was commissioned a second lieutenant in June 1957, following graduation from Auburn University. His later military education included the Command and General Staff College and the Naval War College.

Mundy's early assignments included service in the 2nd Marine Regiment, 2nd Marine Division; duty aboard the aircraft carrier  and the cruiser ; instructor at The Basic School; and as Officer Selection Officer, Raleigh, North Carolina. In 1966–67, Mundy served in Vietnam as operations and executive officer of the 3rd Battalion, 26th Marines, 3rd Marine Division, and as an intelligence officer in the Headquarters, III Marine Amphibious Force.

After the Vietnam War, Mundy's principal assignments were:
Aide de Camp to the Assistant Commandant of the Marine Corps
Inspector & Instructor, 4th Air-Naval Gunfire Liaison Company, Miami, Florida
Commanding Officer, 2nd Battalion, 4th Marines, 3rd Marine Division
Plans Officer, Headquarters Marine Corps
Assistant Chief of Staff for Intelligence, 2nd Marine Division
Chief of Staff, Sixth Marine Amphibious Brigade
Commanding Officer, 2nd Marine Regiment, 2nd Marine Division from 27 March 1981 - 30 April 1982 and 36th and 38th Marine Amphibious Units.

Following advancement to brigadier general in April 1982, Mundy's assignments were:
Director of Personnel Procurement, Headquarters Marine Corps
Commanding General, Landing Force Training Command, U.S. Atlantic Fleet, and Commanding General, 4th Marine Amphibious Brigade
Advanced to Major General in April 1986
Director of Operations, Plans, Policies and Operations Department, Headquarters Marine Corps
Advanced to Lieutenant General in March 1988
Deputy Chief of Staff for Plans, Policies and Operations, Headquarters Marine Corps; Operations Deputy to the Joint Chiefs of Staff
Commanding General of the Fleet Marine Force, Atlantic, the II Marine Expeditionary Force, the Allied Command Atlantic Marine Striking Force, and designated to command Fleet Marine Forces which might be employed in Europe
Promoted to General on July 1, 1991
Commandant of the Marine Corps from July 1, 1991 to June 30, 1995

Remarks on minority officers
In an October 31, 1993 segment on the CBS program 60 Minutes on the dearth of  minority promotions in the U.S. Marine Corps, General Mundy was quoted as saying, "In the military skills, we find that the minority officers do not shoot as well as the non-minorities. They don't swim as well. And when you give them a compass and send them across the terrain at night in a land navigation exercise, they don't do as well at that sort of thing." Mundy, noted for being blunt, though possibly the "victim of selective editing", apologized for "any offense that may have been taken" from his remarks. According to The Times, the general elaborated on this question at a 1993 commemoration of the Battle of Iwo Jima, when commenting on Ira Hayes, he said "Were Ira Hayes here today ... I would tell him that although my words on another occasion have given the impression that I believe some Marines ... because of their color ... are not as capable as other Marines ... that those were not the thoughts of my mind ... and that they are not the thoughts of my heart.

Position on married Marines
Mundy issued an order in 1993 to cut down (and eventually eliminate) the recruitment category for married Marines; the order was rescinded following a public outcry.

Opposition to gay people serving in the military
Mundy was an outspoken opponent of allowing gay people to serve in the military. As a compromise with others who were less strongly opposed, Mundy shaped the "Don't ask, don't tell" (DADT) policy, a 1993 law stating that self-identified homosexuals are not eligible for military service. Mundy distributed copies of The Gay Agenda, a 1992 video asserting that homosexuality is an unnatural sickness, to the other members of the Joint Chiefs of Staff in an effort to persuade them. In a January 1993 meeting with President Clinton and the Joint Chiefs of Staff, Mundy said that those who admit to being gay or who associate with Gay Pride "will have a negative effect" and that it "fractures teamwork." For a person to "proclaim: I'm gay" is the "same as I'm KKK, Nazi, rapist."

Mundy was signatory to an open letter delivered to President Barack Obama and Members of Congress expressing continued support for DADT. The letter said in part, "We believe that imposing this burden on our men and women in uniform would undermine recruiting and retention, impact leadership at all echelons, have adverse effects on the willingness of parents who lend their sons and daughters to military service, and eventually break the All-Volunteer Force."  However unlike the 34th commandant, General James T. Conway, Mundy has said that if the restriction were repealed the troops should not be segregated.

Awards and decorations
Mundy's awards include: 
 

Mundy also held several awards of both the Rifle and Pistol Expert Badges.
Note: The gold US Navy Parachute Rigger badge was worn unofficially by USMC personnel in place of US Army parachutist badge from 1942 to 1963 before it officially became the Navy and Marine Corps Parachutist insignia on July 12, 1963 per BuPers Notice 1020. Members of the Marine Corps who attended jump school before 1963 were issued the silver Army parachutist badge but may be depicted wearing the gold Navy Parachute Rigger badge as it was common practice during this time period.

Personal life

Mundy was married and had three children – two sons and a daughter. Both sons were United States Marine Corps officers. One, Carl E. Mundy III, is a retired Marine Corps lieutenant general.

Death
Mundy died of Merkel cell carcinoma at his home in Alexandria, Virginia, on April 2, 2014 at the age of 78. A memorial service was held for Mundy on April 12 at the Marine Corps War Memorial in Arlington, Virginia. His funeral and burial service, at First United Methodist Church and Greenhill Cemetery respectively, were held on April 19 in Waynesville, North Carolina.

Notes

References

Further reading

External links

1935 births
2014 deaths
General Dynamics
Recipients of the Defense Distinguished Service Medal
Recipients of the Navy Distinguished Service Medal
Recipients of the Distinguished Service Medal (US Army)
Recipients of the Air Force Distinguished Service Medal
Recipients of the Coast Guard Distinguished Service Medal
Recipients of the Legion of Merit
United States Marine Corps personnel of the Vietnam War
United States Marine Corps Commandants
United States Marine Corps generals
Auburn University alumni
Naval War College alumni
Recipients of the Gallantry Cross (Vietnam)
Commandeurs of the Légion d'honneur
Grand Crosses of Naval Merit
Grand Crosses of the Order of the Liberator General San Martin
Recipients of the Decoration of Merit
People from Atlanta
United States Army Command and General Staff College alumni
Deaths from Merkel-cell carcinoma